Mercurial is a distributed revision control tool for software developers. It is supported on Microsoft Windows and Unix-like systems, such as FreeBSD, macOS, and Linux.

Mercurial's major design goals include high performance and scalability, decentralization, fully distributed collaborative development, robust handling of both plain text and binary files, and advanced branching and merging capabilities, while remaining conceptually simple. It includes an integrated web-interface. Mercurial has also taken steps to ease the transition for users of other version control systems, particularly Subversion. Mercurial is primarily a command-line driven program, but graphical user interface extensions are available, e.g. TortoiseHg, and several IDEs offer support for version control with Mercurial. All of Mercurial's operations are invoked as arguments to its driver program hg (a reference to Hg – the chemical symbol of the element mercury).

Olivia Mackall originated Mercurial and served as its lead developer until late 2016. Mercurial is released as free software under the GPL-2.0-or-later license. It is mainly implemented using the Python programming language, but includes a binary diff implementation written in C.

History 
Mackall first announced Mercurial on 19 April 2005. The impetus for this was the announcement earlier that month by Bitmover that they were withdrawing the free version of BitKeeper because of the development of SourcePuller.

BitKeeper had been used for the version control requirements of the Linux kernel project. Mackall decided to write a distributed version control system as a replacement for use with the Linux kernel. This project started a few days after the now well-known Git project was initiated by Linus Torvalds with similar aims.

The Linux kernel project decided to use Git rather than Mercurial, but Mercurial is now used by many other projects (see below).

In an answer on the Mercurial mailing list, Olivia Mackall explained how the name "Mercurial" was chosen:

High-profile projects such as the OpenJDK have used Mercurial in the past, though the OpenJDK no longer does as of Java 16.

Design 
Mercurial uses SHA-1 hashes to identify revisions. For repository access via a network, Mercurial uses an HTTP-based protocol that seeks to reduce round-trip requests, new connections, and data transferred. Mercurial can also work over SSH where the protocol is very similar to the HTTP-based protocol. By default it uses a 3-way merge before calling external merge tools.

Usage 
Figure 1 shows some of the most important operations in Mercurial and their relations to Mercurial's concepts.

Adoption 
Although Mercurial was not selected to manage the Linux kernel sources, it has been adopted by several organizations, including Facebook, the W3C, and Mozilla. Facebook is using the Rust programming language to write Mononoke, a Mercurial server specifically designed to support large multi-project repositories.

In 2013, Facebook adopted Mercurial and began work on scaling it to handle their large, unified code repository.

Google also uses Mercurial client as a front-end on their cloud-based 'Piper' monorepo back-end.

Bitbucket announced that its web-based version control services would end support for Mercurial in June 2020 (then extended to July 2020), explaining that "less than 1% of new projects use it, and developer surveys indicated that 90% of developers use Git".

Mercurial servers and repository management 
 Heptapod, a GitLab fork for Mercurial by Octobus
 GNU Octave  for Octave and related software
 Kallithea, a GPLv3 fork of RhodeCode
 Kiln by Fog Creek Software
 Phabricator by Phacility
 RhodeCode by RhodeCode Inc.

Source code hosting 

The following websites provide free source code hosting for Mercurial repositories:
 Bitbucket by Atlassian (deprecated from February 2020; read-only since July 2020)
 Codebase
 FusionForge
 GNU Octave for Octave-related software and packages 
 GNU Savannah by FSF
 Heptapod
 Mozdev
 OSDN
 Others
 Perforce
 Puszcza (a sister site to GNU Savannah, hosted in Ukraine)
 SourceForge
 SourceHut
 TuxFamily

Open source projects using Mercurial 
Some projects using the Mercurial distributed RCS:

 GNU Health
 GNU Multi-Precision Library
 GNU Octave

 LEMON
 LiquidFeedback
 Mozilla (also uses Git/GitHub)
 Nginx
 Orthanc
 Pidgin
 PyPy
 RhodeCode
 Roundup

 Tryton
 WinDirStat
 wmii
 XEmacs
 Xine

See also 

 Comparison of version-control software
 Distributed version control
 List of version-control software

Notes

References

External links 

 
 , freely available online
 
  covering both basic and advanced use
 
 
 
 List of projects using Mercurial from the Mercurial wiki
 

2005 software
Cross-platform free software
Distributed version control systems
Free software programmed in C
Free software programmed in Python
Free version control software
Version control systems